Bird Box is a 2014 post-apocalyptic novel and the debut novel by American writer and singer Josh Malerman. The book was first published in the United Kingdom on March 27, 2014, through Harper Voyager and in the United States on May 13, 2014, through Ecco Press. The book follows a woman who must find a way to guide herself and her children to safety despite the potential threat from an unseen adversary. The story is partially told via flashbacks and takes place during three time periods.

A sequel to the book, titled Malorie, was released on July 21, 2020. Bird Box was adapted into a film of the same name in 2018.

Synopsis
The book takes place in the present day, and two previous periods are revealed in flashback sequences. The story is told from the perspective of the main character, Malorie. This synopsis is in chronological order.

The Problem

Upon discovering her pregnancy, Malorie is unable to contact her one-night stand. She initially dismisses international news reports of people going mad to the point of killing those nearby and then themselves shortly after seeing "something" outside, but begins to become fearful as reports start coming in from the United States. As the occurrences spread, the "something" is believed to be some sort of "creature" and the situation referred to as "The Problem". The entire world begins to shelter in place and cover all windows to their houses.

In the early days of "The Problem", Malorie comes across a newspaper advertisement encouraging people to seek shelter with them in their safe house.  She writes it off until she is forced to strike out on her own after her sister Shannon commits suicide, accidentally seeing the creature when a blanket covering her window comes loose. Malorie eventually makes it to the safe house and shelters with other survivors: Jules and his border collie Victor, Felix, Tom, Don, Cheryl, and later Olympia, who, like Malorie, is about four months pregnant. They spend their days sequestered inside the home, only going outside blindfolded to fetch water or empty out waste. Tom, the de facto leader of the group, tells Malorie the original owner, George, was the one who came up with the idea of the safe house and advertisement but was no longer with them.  George had theories that the creatures could be viewed indirectly, which, if true, would allow humans to still see and be safe.  George put his theories to the test by filming out of a window and then had the other housemates tie him to a chair while he watched the video.  This tactic failed and George killed himself afterwards.

Tom comes up with the idea of using dogs as seeing eye dogs, believing animals were immune to the creatures, but Jules refuses to put his dog, Victor, at risk.  Tom and Jules decide to search the neighboring houses for supplies and for dogs they can train.  On their excursion they find supplies, two huskies, and some birds kept in a box.  On their way home, they encounter a tent bizarrely in the middle of the street in front of their house.  Tom excitedly explains they can use the "bird box" as an alarm system by hanging it outside their house since the birds coo whenever anything comes near. 

After months of isolation they are surprised by a knock on the door - a man named Gary. He asks for asylum as he claims he left his previous location because a man named Frank, a recluse obsessed with writing in journals, believed "The Problem" was merely caused by mass hysteria.  The final straw for Gary was when Frank uncovered all the windows and opened the doors to prove this "insanity fuss" was all an illusion. Gary and Don become friends, frequently discussing Frank and Frank's ideology. Malorie is extremely suspicious of Gary and one night secretly opens Gary's briefcase and finds "Frank's" journal.  She does not want to confront Gary though because Tom and Jules have gone on another excursion to Tom's house to pick up medical supplies (for the upcoming births) and a phone book so that they may call and see if they can contact other survivors.  When Tom and Jules return, Malorie reveals this to the housemates and the house has a vote, where all of the members except Don vote to evict Gary.  Don becomes more and more withdrawn and eventually moves into the cellar.

Time passes and the housemates call every number they can find in the phone book to no avail, but they were able to leave voice messages for several numbers.  Olympia and Malorie both go into labour and are taken to the attic to give birth when there's a commotion from downstairs.  It is revealed that Don had been secretly sheltering Gary in the cellar since Gary's "eviction".  Gary goes up to the attic to taunt Malorie and reveals to her that he is indeed "Frank" and has no issues seeing the creatures; in fact it was his tent outside their house and he had been watching the occupants of the house as well as the creatures all along.  Malorie realizes Gary was insane prior to the creatures and thus seems to be unaffected by seeing them.  Downstairs, Don has done what "Frank" had done and taken down all the window coverings and opened the front door causing all the other housemates to go mad and kill each other except for Victor, who was shut in the cellar.  Gary opens the door to the attic to allow the creature to come inside.  Malorie immediately shuts her eyes but Olympia sees it and describes it as "beautiful" and "not bad at all" before going mad.  Even through her madness though, with some coaxing from Malorie, Olympia gives Malorie her child before committing suicide.  Malorie covers both children's faces until Gary and the creature leave. 

Malorie discovers the dead bodies of all her other housemates but finds Victor, the border collie, alive in the cellar, believing Jules forced Victor in there for his safety before being overcome by the madness.  The phone rings and she answers.  A survivor named Rick is on the other side telling her he got Tom's message and that they have a very safe refuge and all are invited to travel there.  He gives her detailed instructions on how to get to their refuge.  Malorie burdened by the grief of the death of her housemates and the burden of raising two newly born children turns down the offer but Rick tells her he'll call her back weekly and that they were welcome any time and no matter the status of the phone lines, to never doubt that the refuge will always be there.

Malorie raises the children using harsh training techniques in order to ensure their survival, heightening their senses and training them to automatically keep their eyes closed. The children are only referred to as "Girl" and "Boy", as she feels that names are an unnecessary luxury. During one of her excursions to retrieve supplies from a bar, Malorie discovers Tom's conjecture that animals are immune to the creatures to be false as Victor confronts a creature and goes mad.

Present day 

When the children turn 4, Malorie decides the day has come to make the journey to Rick's safe house.  She chooses this day because there is a heavy fog she hopes will hide their escape in case Gary still watches the house. Malorie inwardly expresses regret over all of the experiences and sights that the children have missed, but knows that it was necessary for their survival. Instructing them to follow her orders and to never remove their blindfolds regardless of what happens, Malorie and the children travel down the river. As they are rowing they come across a person who tries to convince them to remove their blindfolds in order to see the "beautiful" creature; however, they ignore him and continue along their journey where they are later beset by wolves, one of whom injures Malorie.

Eventually Malorie hears Tom's voice which surprises her but then realizes that Rick has used Tom's voicemail as the signal.  But as she is prepared to remove the blindfold, the Boy says he hears something walking through the river toward them. The creature pulls at her blindfold, but then releases it and leaves them.  Malorie is terrified to remove the blindfold, but knows that it is necessary to see which split of the river to take. She removes her blindfold and briefly marvels at sights previously denied due to the Problem before navigating down the correct path and replacing her blindfold. Eventually they make it to the refuge, which she discovers was originally a school for the blind.  They are met by the blind Rick, a sighted Constance, and dozens of other people who have blinded themselves to remain unaffected. Now certain in their safety, Malorie finally allows herself to name the children "Tom" and "Olympia" and tells them to remove their blindfolds.

Reception
Critical reception for Bird Box has been positive and Malerman has received comparisons to Stephen King and Jonathan Carroll. Tasha Robinson of The A.V. Club gave the book a B rating, writing "Malerman overreaches a bit in his debut, which could use as much attention to the cast as to the mood, but the mood is chillingly effective. Reading it feels like accepting a dare to walk into a strange place, eyes closed, with no idea who, or what, might be reaching out to make contact."

Malerman wrote the rough draft of Bird Box prior to the release of the 2008 M. Night Shyamalan film The Happening and the 2009 film The Road (although the novel The Road was written in 2006), which caused him to worry that the book "might get lost in the shuffle."

Awards and nominations
 Michigan Notable Book Award (2015, won)
 James Herbert Award (2015, nominated)
 Bram Stoker Award for Best First Novel (2015, nominated)

Film adaptation

Film rights to Bird Box were optioned by Universal Studios in 2013, prior to the book's release. Scott Stuber and Chris Morgan were initially set to produce the film, with Andy Muschietti (It, Mama) as director and Eric Heisserer in negotiations to pen the script. Netflix then acquired the rights of the book with Sandra Bullock and John Malkovich in starring roles, Morgan co-producing, Heisserer writing, and Susanne Bier as the director.

References

2014 American novels
American post-apocalyptic novels
American novels adapted into films
Ecco Press books
2014 debut novels